Pusiola aureola is a moth in the subfamily Arctiinae. It was described by Sven Jorgen R. Birket-Smith in 1965. It is found in Nigeria.

References

Endemic fauna of Nigeria
Moths described in 1965
Lithosiini
Moths of Africa